The Naval Aircraft Factory TG were a series of prototype seaplanes for gunnery training designed and built by the United States Navy's Naval Aircraft Factory.

Development
The TG was an equal-span biplane with tandem open cockpits. It had a large central float with a smaller stabilizing float underneath each wingtip. Five were built for evaluation designated TG-1, TG-2, TG-3, TG-4 and TG-5 and were generally similar. The TG-1, TG-3 and TG-4 had internal fuselage fuel tanks and the TG-2 and TG-5 had fuel tanks inside the central float.

Variants
TG-1
Powered by a 200hp (149kW) Liberty engine, one built.
TG-2
Powered by a 200hp (149kW) Liberty engine, one built.
TG-3
Powered by a 200hp (149kW) Aeromarine T-6 engine, one built.
TG-4
Powered by a 200hp (149kW) Aeromarine T-6 engine, one built.
TG-5
Powered by a 180hp (134kW) Wright-Hispano E-4 engine, one built.

Operator

United States Navy

Specifications (TG-2)

See also

References

 

1920s United States military trainer aircraft
Floatplanes
TG
Biplanes
Single-engined tractor aircraft